The Hôtel Solvay is a large Art Nouveau town house designed by Victor Horta on the Avenue Louise/Louizalaan in Brussels, Belgium. The house was commissioned by Armand Solvay, the son of the chemist and industrialist Ernest Solvay, and built from 1898 to 1900. 

Together with three other town houses of Victor Horta, including Horta's own house and workshop, it was added to the UNESCO World Heritage list in 2000.

History
The Hôtel Solvay was designed and built by Horta, between 1898 and 1900, to serve as a private residence for Armand Solvay, the son of the chemist, industrialist and philanthropist Ernest Solvay. For this wealthy patron, Horta could spend a fortune on precious materials and expensive details. He designed every single detail; furniture, carpets, light fittings, tableware and even the doorbell. He used expensive materials such as marble, onyx, bronze, tropical woods, etc. For the decoration of the staircase, he cooperated with the pointillist painter Théo van Rysselberghe.

The Hôtel Solvay and most of its content remained intact thanks to the Wittamer family. They acquired the house in the 1950s and did the utmost to preserve and restore this magnificent dwelling. The house is still private property and can only be visited by appointment and under very strict conditions. As of Saturday, 23 January 2021, the building will start operating as a museum and will be accepting visitors twice a week.

Awards
The UNESCO commission recognised the Hôtel Solvay as UNESCO World Heritage in 2000, as part of the listing 'Major Town Houses of the Architect Victor Horta':

Gallery

See also
 Art Nouveau in Brussels
 History of Brussels
 Belgium in "the long nineteenth century"

References

Notes

Bibliography
 Françoise Aubry and Jos Vandenbreeden, Horta, Art Nouveau to Modernism, Ludion Press Ghent — Harry N. Abrams Publishers New York, 1996.

External links

 www.hotelsolvay.be
 Hôtel Solvay on BALaT - Belgian Art Links and Tools (KIK-IRPA, Brussels)
 https://www.themayor.eu/en/a/view/art-nouveau-pearl-hotel-solvay-opens-to-the-public-7041

Houses in Belgium
City of Brussels
World Heritage Sites in Belgium
Victor Horta buildings
Art Nouveau architecture in Brussels
Art Nouveau houses
Houses completed in 1900